Richard George Lines (born August 17, 1938) is a Canadian former Major League Baseball relief pitcher who appeared in 107 games for the Washington Senators in  and . Born in Montréal but a graduate of Manchester High School in Midlothian, Virginia, Lines spent 13 years in professional baseball (1957–1969).

Lines was signed by the Pittsburgh Pirates before the 1957 season, and was a starting pitcher for eight years in the minor leagues before being converted to relief in 1965 with the Hawaii Islanders of the Triple-A Pacific Coast League. He made the Washington club the next year, and was an effective relief pitcher for the Senators during his two full seasons with them. He finished his brief major-league career with a total of seven wins, seven losses, six saves, 41 games finished, an excellent WHIP of 1.150, and an ERA of 2.83. In 168 innings pitched, he permitted 146 hits and 48 bases on balls, striking out 103.

External links

Retrosheet

1938 births
Living people
Anglophone Quebec people
Asheville Tourists players
Baseball players from Montreal
Buffalo Bisons (minor league) players
Canadian expatriate baseball players in the United States
Clinton Pirates players
Columbus Jets players
Hawaii Islanders players
Lincoln Chiefs players
Major League Baseball pitchers
Major League Baseball players from Canada
Salt Lake City Bees players
San Diego Padres (minor league) players
Savannah Senators players
Washington Senators (1961–1971) players